Wooster High School may refer to:

 Earl Wooster High School, Reno, Nevada, United States
 Wooster High School (Ohio), Wooster, United States